Dialogue is an album by jazz vibraphonist Bobby Hutcherson, released on the Blue Note label in 1965. This was Hutcherson's first LP released as bandleader (an earlier session, The Kicker, has since been issued on CD by Blue Note) following work with Eric Dolphy. The album features four Andrew Hill compositions and two Joe Chambers pieces. It has received widespread critical acclaim and is considered by most critics one of Hutcherson's greatest achievements.

Composition and recording
Written in an 8/4 Latin style, the opener, "Catta", is the most conventional piece on the album (as drummer Chambers said in the liner notes; "conventional?"). "Idle While" is a lyrical waltz provided by Chambers. "Les Noirs Marchent", meaning "The Blacks are marching" is a militaristic style free song dedicated to the civil rights movement. "Dialogue" is the most free in nature, with an ominous opening phrase played by Hutcherson, before the others proceed to abandon the idea of a solo. "Ghetto Lights" was written whilst Bobby was at Hill's house and was inspired by a tune played by Hill's wife, Laverne. As Hutcherson recounted, "some of her tunes had a real ghetto feel". "Jasper" was originally released on the 1968 record Spiral.

Reception
The Penguin Guide to Jazz awarded it the maximum four stars, as well as the special "crown" accolade in the first and second editions. According to the authors: "Dialogue stands head and shoulders above [Hutcherson's other classic Blue Note dates]. Drawing on some of the free-harmonic and -rhythmic innovations developed on Eric Dolphy's Out to Lunch (on which Hutcherson played), he began to develop a complex contrapuntal style that involved parallel melodies rather than unisons and complex rhythmic patterns which he conceived... as focal points round which the musicians operated." AllMusic's Steve Huey gave the album five stars as well writing: "Dialogue remains Hutcherson's most adventurous, "outside" album, and while there are more extensive showcases for his playing, this high-caliber session stands as arguably his greatest musical achievement".

Track listing
 "Catta" (Hill) - 7:19
 "Idle While" (Chambers) - 6:37
 "Les Noirs Marchant" (Hill) - 6:41
 "Dialogue" (Chambers) - 9:59
 "Ghetto Lights" (Hill) - 6:16
 "Jasper" (Hill) - 8:29 Bonus track on CD reissue

Personnel
Bobby Hutcherson – vibraphone (all), marimba (3, 4).
Sam Rivers – tenor saxophone (1, 6) soprano saxophone (5), bass clarinet (4, 5, 6), flute (2, 3)
Freddie Hubbard – trumpet
Andrew Hill – piano
Richard Davis – double bass
Joe Chambers – drums

References 

1965 debut albums
Blue Note Records albums
Bobby Hutcherson albums
Hard bop albums
Post-bop albums
Albums produced by Alfred Lion
Albums recorded at Van Gelder Studio